Forbidden to Forbid (also known as É Proibido Proibir) is a 2006 Brazilian-Chilean-Spanish drama film directed by Jorge Durán. It stars Caio Blat, Maria Flor and Alexandre Rodrigues as teenagers in a love triangle.

Plot
Paulo is a medical student who shares a small apartment with Leon, his best friend and a sociology student. Leon is dating Leticia, but she and Paulo fall in love. The trio tries to help Rosalina, a terminally ill patient at the University Hospital, reunite with her children who haven't visited her in a long time. While attempting to save Cacauzinho, one of Rosalina's sons, Leon is injured in a shootout. Leticia manages to rescue him, but for Leon to survive, Paulo will have to operate on him in his own home.

Cast
Caio Blat as Paulo
Maria Flor as Letícia
Alexandre Rodrigues as Leon
Edyr Duqui as Rosalinda
 Adriano de Jesus as Cacazinho
 Luciano Vidigal as Mário
 Raquel Pedras as Rita

Production
Durán searched locations to film during three months, with the filming itself taking place in five weeks in the suburbs of Rio de Janeiro. After four weeks of production, the editing lasted four months.

Reception
Forbidden to Forbid won the Films in Progress Award of the 53rd San Sebastián International Film Festival, and the Best Screenplay and New Director of the Festival de Cine Iberoamericano de Huelva. It won the 2nd FestCine Goiânia for the Best Film, Best Actor for Alexandre Rodrigues, and Best Editing. Durán won the Best Director Award at the Valdivia International Film Festival, while Blat received the Best Actor Award of the Festival de Cinema Luso-Brasileiro de Santa Maria da Feira. At the 11th Brazilian Film Festival of Miami, it won the Best Film Award, Best Director, and Best Actor Award for Blat. It won the Jury Special Award of the 28th Havana Film Festival and of the 4th Quito Festival Cero Latitud, as well as the Best Film Award of the 2006 Biarritz Film Festival and of the 2006 Viña del Mar International Film Festival. It also received a Margarida de Prata Award from the National Conference of Bishops of Brazil.

References

External links

2006 drama films
2006 films
Brazilian drama films
Films shot in Rio de Janeiro (city)
Films about interracial romance
2000s Portuguese-language films
Spanish drama films
Chilean drama films